In enzymology, a glycine reductase is an enzyme that catalyzes the chemical reaction

acetyl phosphate + NH3 + thioredoxin disulfide + H2O  glycine + phosphate + thioredoxin

The 4 substrates of this enzyme are acetyl phosphate, NH3, thioredoxin disulfide, and H2O, whereas its 3 products are glycine, phosphate, and thioredoxin.

This enzyme belongs to the family of oxidoreductases, to be specific, those acting on X-H and Y-H to form an X-Y bond with a disulfide as acceptor.  The systematic name of this enzyme class is acetyl-phosphate ammonia:thioredoxin disulfide oxidoreductase (glycine-forming).

References

 
 

EC 1.21.4
Enzymes of unknown structure